Chabertiidae is a family of nematodes belonging to the order Strongylida.

Genera:
 Arundelia Mawson, 1977 
 Beveridgea Mawson, 1980 
 Bourgelatia Railliet, Henry & Bauche, 1919

References

Nematodes